"Bal privé" is a song by German girl group Preluders. It was written by Johnsson, Jonas Blee, Håkan Lundberg and for their debut studio album Girls in the House (2003). Production was helmed by Jörn-Uwe Fahrenkrog-Petersen and Gena Wernik, with co-production by Felix Schönewald. The song was released as the album's second single on 9 February 2004 and reached the top thiry of the German Singles Chart.

Formats and track listings

Credits and personnel

 Daniel Almeida Torres – piano
 Miriam Cani – vocals
 Anh-Thu Doan – vocals
 Jörn-Uwe Fahrenkrog-Petersen – production
 Artemis Gounaki – vocal arrangement
 Nik Hafemann – supervising producer

 Franka Lampe – accordion
 Rebecca Miro – vocals
 Anne Ross – vocals
 Patricia Sadowski – vocals
 Felix Schönewald – co-production, mixing
 Gena Wernik – production, mixing

Charts

References

2004 songs
Preluders songs
Polydor Records singles